Acidiphilium cryptum is a species of heterotrophic bacteria, the type species of its genus. It is gram-negative, aerobic, mesophilic and rod-shaped. It does not form endospores and some cells are motile by means of one polar flagellum or two lateral flagella Lhet2 (=ATCC 33463) is the type strain.

References

Further reading

External links
LPSN
Type strain of Acidiphilium cryptum at BacDive -  the Bacterial Diversity Metadatabase

Rhodospirillales
Bacteria described in 1981